Phiala pretoriana is a moth in the family Eupterotidae. It was described by Wichgraf in 1908. It is found in South Africa (Gauteng).

References

Endemic moths of South Africa
Moths described in 1908
Eupterotinae